Jerome Elbrycht  is a French freestyle skier and cable park wakeboarder.

Elbrycht competed at the Winter X Games XX in Aspen, Colorado in January 2016, where he won a gold medal in Mono Skier X.

References

External links
 

Year of birth missing (living people)
Living people
X Games athletes
French male freestyle skiers